Daeunsan is a mountain located in Onyang, Ulju County, Ulsan, South Korea. The mountain was previously named Bulgwangsan.

See also
Geography of Korea
List of South Korean tourist attractions
List of mountains in Korea
List of mountains by elevation
Mountain portal
South Korea portal

References

Mountains of Ulsan
Mountains of South Gyeongsang Province
Ulju County
Tourist attractions in Ulsan
Mountains of South Korea